The Pont des Arts or Passerelle des Arts is a pedestrian bridge in Paris which crosses the River Seine. It links the Institut de France and the central square (cour carrée) of the Palais du Louvre, (which had been termed the "Palais des Arts" under the First French Empire).

History 

Between 1802 and 1804, under the government of Napoleon Bonaparte, a nine-arch metallic bridge for pedestrians was constructed at the location of the present day Pont des Arts: this was the first metal bridge in Paris. The engineers Louis-Alexandre de Cessart and Jacques Dillon initially conceived of a bridge which would resemble a suspended garden, with trees, banks of flowers, and benches. Passage across the bridge at that time cost one sou.

On 17 March 1975, the French Ministry of Culture listed the Pont des Arts as a national historic monument.

In 1976, the Inspector of Bridges and Causeways (Ponts et Chaussées) reported several deficiencies on the bridge. More specifically, he noted the damage that had been caused by two aerial bombardments sustained during World War I and World War II and the harm done from the multiple collisions caused by boats.  The bridge would be closed to circulation in 1977 and, in 1979, suffered a 60-metre collapse after a barge rammed into it.

The present bridge was built between 1981 and 1984 "identically" according to the plans of Louis Arretche, who had decided to reduce the number of arches from nine to seven, allowing the look of the old bridge to be preserved while realigning the new structure with the Pont Neuf. On 27 June 1984, the newly reconstructed bridge was inaugurated by Jacques Chirac, then the mayor of Paris.

The bridge has sometimes served as a place for art exhibitions, and is today a "studio en plein air" for painters, artists and photographers who are drawn to its unique point of view. The Pont des Arts is also frequently a spot for picnics during the summer.

The Argentinian writer, Julio Cortázar, talks about this bridge in his 1963 book Rayuela. When Horacio Oliveira goes with the pythia and this tells him that the bridge for La Maga is the "Ponts des Arts".

In 1991, UNESCO listed the entire Parisian riverfront, from the Eiffel Tower to the end of the Ile Saint Louis, as a World Heritage Site. Therefore, the Pont des Arts is now a part of this UNESCO World Heritage Site.

Love locks 

Since late 2008, tourists have taken to attaching lovelocks with their first names written or engraved on them to the railing or the grate on the side of the bridge, then throwing the key into the Seine river below, as a romantic gesture. This gesture is said to represent a couple's committed love. Although this is not a French tradition and has only been taking place in Paris since the end of 2008, with locks occasionally being cut off by city workers, since 2012 the number of locks covering the bridge has become overwhelming, with locks being attached upon other locks. In February 2014, Le Monde estimated that there were over 700,000 locks; with the 2014 summer tourist season, many thousands more have since been added, creating a serious safety concern for city authorities and an aesthetic issue for Parisians.

By 2014, concern was being expressed about the possible damage the weight of the locks was doing to the structure of the bridge. In May, the newly elected mayor, Anne Hidalgo, announced that she was tasking her First Deputy Mayor, Bruno Julliard, with finding alternatives to love locks in Paris. In June, part of the parapet on the bridge collapsed under the weight of all of the padlocks that had been attached to it.

In August 2014, the Paris Mayor's Office began to say publicly that they wanted to encourage tourists to take "selfies" instead of leaving love locks, when they launched the "Love Without Locks" campaign and social media hashtag. The web site states: "Our bridges can no longer withstand your gestures of love. Set them free by declaring your love with #lovewithoutlocks." With the high tourist season in full swing, more than 50% of the panels on the Pont des Arts had to be boarded over with plywood because the weight of the locks (estimated by the city to be 700 kg per panel) was creating the risk of more panels collapsing.

On 18 September 2014, the City Hall of Paris replaced three panels of this bridge with a special glass as an experiment as they search for alternative materials for the bridge where locks cannot be attached.

From 1 June 2015, city council workmen from Paris started to cut down all the locks after years of complaints from locals. Health and Safety officials said "the romantic gestures cause long term Heritage degradation and danger to visitors". As of 2015, over a million locks were placed, weighing approximately 45 tons. Street artists like Jace, El Seed, Brusk or Pantonio have been chosen to paint the new panels that replaces the old railings with locks.

Access 

By foot from Quai François Mitterrand from the right bank of the Seine, and Quai Malaquais or Quai de Conti from the left bank.

Popular culture 

Due to its recognizable nature, the bridge has been featured in numerous films and television shows. Le Pont des Arts directed by Eugène Green is the story is of a young man who falls in love with and finds the whole meaning of his life contained in a young woman who sings a baroque lament on record. He discovers she committed suicide from the Pont des Arts, so that is the only way he can be with her too. The action unrolls in Paris between 1979 and 1980, in other words it occurs during the collapsing of the bridge.  The film was presented in 2004 at the 57th Locarno International Film Festival.

The bridge was used in the last scene of the 1995 film Sabrina, and appeared on the 2004 finale of Sex and the City.

The bridge has also been featured in the 2013 Hollywood heist adventure film Now You See Me, directed by Louis Leterrier, where Alma Dray (Mélanie Laurent) is met by Dylan Rhodes (Mark Ruffalo). Alma takes a lock and a key that Dylan produces, putting the lock on a chain fence and throwing the key into the Seine.

Art historian Kenneth Clark wrote about the Pont des Arts in his book Civilisation:

St. Germain released a song called "Pont Des Arts" on his 2000 album Tourist. Garden City Movement released a song by the same name in 2014.

The bridge was the site of love lock-unlocking tasks on Amazing Race and HaMerotz LaMillion 3. The bridge also served as the Pit Stop for the fifth leg of The Amazing Race 32.

Honoré de Balzac described the bridge in Splendeurs et misères des courtisanes as follows:

See also 

List of locations with love locks

References

External links 

  Pont des Arts from the City Hall of Paris site (Archive)
  Insecula
 Pont des Arts on Structurae

Arts
Arts
Arts
Arts
Buildings and structures in the 1st arrondissement of Paris
Buildings and structures in the 6th arrondissement of Paris
Articles containing video clips
Tourist attractions in Paris